Scott Neslin is an American economist, currently the Albert Wesley Frey Professor at Tuck School of Business, Dartmouth College.

References

Year of birth missing (living people)
Living people
Tuck School of Business faculty
American economists
Place of birth missing (living people)